The Web Service Conversation Language (WSCL) proposal defines the overall input and output message sequences for one web service using a finite state automaton FSA over the alphabet of message types.

External links
 Web Service Conversation Language (WSCL) proposal

Web service specifications
World Wide Web Consortium standards
XML-based standards
Web services